Lymantria lunata, the luna gypsy moth, is a moth of the family Erebidae. The species was first described by Caspar Stoll in 1782. It is found in Southeast Asia, from India to the northeast coast of Australia.

The wingspan is about 60 mm. The body is brown and the wings are white with a pattern of brown lines on the forewings.

The larvae have been recorded feeding on Mangifera indica, Buchanania muelleri and Ficus benjamina.

Subspecies
Lymantria lunata lunata
Lymantria lunata diversa
Lymantria lunata curvifera

References

Lymantria
Moths described in 1782